Angela Mortimer and Anne Shilcock were the defending champions, but lost in the semifinal to Fay Muller and Daphne Seeney.

Angela Buxton and Althea Gibson defeated Muller and Seeney in the final, 6–1, 8–6 to win the ladies' doubles tennis title at the 1956 Wimbledon Championships.

Seeds

  Louise Brough /  Shirley Fry (semifinals)
  Angela Mortimer /  Anne Shilcock (semifinals)
  Angela Buxton /  Althea Gibson (champions)
  Beverly Fleitz /  Darlene Hard (second round)

Draw

Finals

Top half

Section 1

Section 2

Bottom half

Section 3

Section 4

References

External links

Women's Doubles
Wimbledon Championship by year – Women's doubles
Wimbledon Championships
Wimbledon Championships